The S&DJR Fox, Walker 0-6-0ST was a class of nine  locomotives built by Fox, Walker and Company for the Somerset and Dorset Joint Railway between 1874 and 1876.  Numbered 1 to 9, all except number 8 passed in the London, Midland and Scottish Railway stock in 1930, who allocated them numbers 1500–1507. Two (1501 and 1503) never received their LMS numbers, and all were withdrawn by the end of 1934. All were scrapped.

References

Somerset and Dorset Joint Railway locomotives
Fox, Walker locomotives
0-6-0ST locomotives
Railway locomotives introduced in 1874
Standard gauge steam locomotives of Great Britain
Scrapped locomotives